Below is a list of squads used in the 1986 African Cup of Nations.

Group A

Coach:  Pancho Gonzalès
|

Coach:  Mike Smith
|

Coach: Manaca
|

Coach: Pape Alioune Diop
|

Group B

Coach: Rabah Saâdane

Coach:  Claude Le Roy

Coach:  José Faria

Coach: Brightwell Banda
|

External links
FIFA
RSSSF
RSSSF - Final Tournament Details

Africa Cup of Nations squads
squads